Irene Naa Torshie Addo (born 30 September 1970) is a Ghanaian politician and lawyer, former Deputy Minister of Foreign Affairs and a Member of Parliament for Tema West Constituency.

Early life
Irene Naa Torshie Addo was born in Osu, Accra, on 30 September 1970.

Education
She is a lawyer by profession and earned an LLM (Gender and Development Studies) from the University of Warwick in 1999.

Career 
As a member of the New Patriotic Party, she became Member of the Ghana Parliament for Tema West during the 2008 elections and assumed office on 7 January 2009 to 6 January 2017 after losing the New Patriotic Party's primaries to Carlos Ahenkorah in 2015.

Irene was appointed as the Administrator of the District Assemblies Common Fund (DACF) by President Nana Addo Dankwa Akufo-Addo.

Personal life
Divorced with two children, she is a Christian who is a Baptist by denomination. She has two daughters in her first marriage: Samantha and Simone and a son named Stanely. The eldest Samantha Abigail Nana Adobea Addo. The second Simone Antonia Naa Adoley Addo and the youngest Stanely Walter Kwamena Adom Addo.

See also 
 MPs elected in the Ghanaian parliamentary election, 2008
 New Patriotic Party

References

1970 births
Living people
New Patriotic Party politicians
Ghanaian MPs 2005–2009
Ghanaian MPs 2009–2013
Government ministers of Ghana
Women members of the Parliament of Ghana
Women government ministers of Ghana
21st-century Ghanaian women politicians